Mažeika is a Lithuanian language family name. Notable people with the surname include:

Gediminas Mažeika (born 1978), Lithuanian football referee
Martynas Mažeika (born 1985), Lithuanian basketball player
Patrick Mazeika (born 1993), American professional baseball player for the San Francisco Giants organization
Pranas Mažeika (1917–2007), Lithuanian basketball player
Sigita Mažeikaitė-Strečen (born 1958), Lithuanian handball player

Lithuanian-language surnames